In number theory, Znám's problem asks which sets of integers have the property that each integer in the set is a proper divisor of the product of the other integers in the set, plus 1. Znám's problem is named after the Slovak mathematician Štefan Znám, who suggested it in 1972, although other mathematicians had considered similar problems around the same time.

The initial terms of Sylvester's sequence almost solve this problem, except that the last chosen term equals one plus the product of the others, rather than being a proper divisor.  showed that there is at least one solution to the (proper) Znám problem for each . Sun's solution is based on a recurrence similar to that for Sylvester's sequence, but with a different set of initial values.

The Znám problem is closely related to Egyptian fractions. It is known that there are only finitely many solutions for any fixed . It is unknown whether there are any solutions to Znám's problem using only odd numbers, and there remain several other open questions.

The problem
Znám's problem asks which sets of integers have the property that each integer in the set is a proper divisor of the product of the other integers in the set, plus 1. That is, given , what sets of integers 

are there such that, for each ,  divides but is not equal to

A closely related problem concerns sets of integers in which each integer in the set is a divisor, but not necessarily a proper divisor, of one plus the product of the other integers in the set. This problem does not seem to have been named in the literature, and will be referred to as the improper Znám problem. Any solution to Znám's problem is also a solution to the improper Znám problem, but not necessarily vice versa.

History 

Examples 
Sylvester's sequence is an integer sequence in which each term is one plus the product of the previous terms. The first few terms of the sequence are

Stopping the sequence early produces a set like  that almost meets the conditions of Znám's problem, except that the largest value equals one plus the product of the other terms, rather than being a proper divisor. Thus, it is a solution to the improper Znám problem, but not a solution to Znám's problem as it is usually defined.

A few calculations will show that

Connection to Egyptian fractions 
Any solution to the improper Znám problem is equivalent (via division by the product of the values ) to a solution to the equation

where  as well as each  must be an integer, and conversely any such solution corresponds to a solution to the improper Znám problem. However, all known solutions have , so they satisfy the equation

That is, they lead to an Egyptian fraction representation of the number one as a sum of unit fractions. Several of the cited papers on Znám's problem study also the solutions to this equation.  describe an application of the equation in topology, to the classification of singularities on surfaces, and  describe an application to the theory of nondeterministic finite automata.

Number of solutions 
The number of solutions to Znám's problem for any  is finite, so it makes sense to count the total number of solutions for each .  showed that there is at least one solution to the (proper) Znám problem for each . Sun's solution is based on a recurrence similar to that for Sylvester's sequence, but with a different set of initial values.
2, 5, 18, 96 .
However, there are infinitely many solutions if  is not fixed:

It is unknown whether there are any solutions to Znám's problem using only odd numbers. With one exception, all known solutions start with 2. If all numbers in a solution to Znám's problem or the improper Znám problem are prime, their product is a primary pseudoperfect number; it is unknown whether infinitely many solutions of this type exist.

References

Notes

Sources

 .
 .
 .
 .
 .
 .
 .
 .
 .
 .
 .
 .

External links 

 
 

Number theory
Integer sequences
Egyptian fractions
Mathematical problems